Adrian Policena (born December 7, 1979), also known as Chris Tsuper, is a multi-awarded radio disc jockey and recording artist in the Philippines. He is best known for his program Tambalang Balasubas at Balahura (with co-host Nicole Hyala) at 90.7 Love Radio and through Love Radio stations nationwide.

Early life
Policena took his primary and secondary education in his hometown of Lucban, Quezon. He is also a graduate of Mass Communication at Far Eastern University. When he headed back to Lucena, he was discovered by Lady Love, the station manager of 100.7 Love Radio Lucena. Thus he began to work as "Carlo Valentino" at that station. A year later, he moved to Love Radio Manila upon being discovered by Wilfredo Espinosa, Love Radio Manila's program director.

Career

Adrian Lagdameo Policena, also known as Love Radio Manila's "Chris Tsuper", is a KBP (Kapisanan ng mga Broadkaster ng Pilipinas) accredited radio announcer, a recording artist, and one of the most sought after product endorsers in Philippine radio today. He is best known for his top-rated morning program "Tambalan" along with Nicole Hyala aired over 90.7 Love Radio Manila and Love Radio stations nationwide. Tambalan is not a typical radio program with two people conversing with each other; rather it engages listeners who have the chance to air out their problems. With Tambalan's special segment, "Ang Kwento ng Mahiwagang Burnay", deals with different human experiences that listeners can relate to— be it bad, silly, exciting, funny, remorseful, or embarrassing— and can make them smile or even laugh.

Aside from the program Tambalan, Chris and co-host Nicole have branched out into recording albums with lyrics that reflect their on-air antics and vibrancy. These songs are another creative way to showcase the relatable everyday Filipino experiences that they feature in their show, Tambalan.

And the entertainment does not stop on air or in albums. Chris has co-authored the number one best-selling book "Tambalan". Due to their success on FM radio, he and Nicole crossed-over to television, as the additional hosts of the Saturday morning edition of Music Uplate Live on ABS-CBN. in 2009.  He also became one of the hosts of the prime noontime show Eat Bulaga "Spogify: The Singing Baes" and "Grabe S'ya!" in 2015 to 2016.
 
His uniqueness, distinct style, creativity, wit, intelligence and sound pieces of advice make Chris Tsuper "the Kambyo King" as he reflects the life of an ordinary Filipino. For thirteen years now, Chris Tsuper has been continuously an inspiration to many. Chris Tsuper has been consistently receiving awards from different organizations and award-giving bodies. This only reflects that Chris Tsuper has demonstrated excellence and creativity and has made an impact in the radio industry.

Discography

Albums

D' Nakakalurkei na Album (2008)

Singles

Filmography

Awards

References

External links
Tambalan Official Website

1979 births
Living people
Filipino radio personalities
People from Quezon
Manila Broadcasting Company people
Far Eastern University alumni